Apelu A. Ioane (born 17 March 1959) is a Samoan boxer. He competed in the men's light welterweight event at the 1984 Summer Olympics. He also represented New Zealand at the Commonwealth Games in 1982 and 1986.

References

External links
 

1959 births
Living people
Light-welterweight boxers
New Zealand male boxers
Samoan male boxers
Olympic boxers of Samoa
Boxers at the 1984 Summer Olympics
Commonwealth Games competitors for New Zealand
Boxers at the 1982 Commonwealth Games
Boxers at the 1986 Commonwealth Games
Place of birth missing (living people)